The discography of Nirvana, an American rock band, consists of three studio albums, twenty-one singles, five live albums, two extended plays, four compilation albums, and two box sets.

Nirvana was formed in 1987 by vocalist and guitarist Kurt Cobain and bassist Krist Novoselic, with the position of drummer being filled by various musicians. The band released its debut album, Bleach, in 1989 on independent label Sub Pop. After being joined by final drummer Dave Grohl and signing to Geffen Records subsidiary DGC Records, the band released its second studio album, Nevermind, which became one of the best selling alternative albums of the 1990s and popularized the Seattle grunge movement and alternative music. The band's third album, In Utero, was also a commercial and critical success, though it did not match the sales precedent set by Nevermind—as the members of the band expected. Nirvana disbanded in 1994 after the death of Cobain; since then several posthumous releases have been issued from the band, which once resulted in a legal conflict between Cobain's widow, Courtney Love, and the surviving members of the band over the release of the song "You Know You're Right". In 2006, Love sold a significant share of the rights to Cobain's song catalog to Primary Wave Music Publishing. Since its debut, the band has sold 27.6 million albums in the United States alone, and over 75 million records worldwide.

Albums

Studio albums

Live albums

Compilation albums

Box sets

Extended plays

Singles

Retail singles

Notes

Promotional singles

Notes

Split singles

Notes

Other charted and certified songs

Music videos

Video albums

Other appearances

Unreleased songs
Courtney Love stated in May 2002 that she owned 109 unreleased tapes made by Cobain, with or without the other members of Nirvana. Of these songs, many were released on the 61 song box set With the Lights Out in 2004, with three "freshly unearthed" songs appearing on the compilation Sliver: The Best of the Box in 2005. More unreleased Nirvana tracks were released on the deluxe and super deluxe 20th anniversary editions of the Nevermind and In Utero albums in 2011 and 2013 respectively. Many more unreleased songs were released on Montage of Heck: The Home Recordings in 2015 which was the companion soundtrack to the film Kurt Cobain: Montage of Heck. Brett Morgen stated that in Cobain's archive he discovered over 200 hours of audio on over 108 cassettes and that he thought the solo album "would be a nice complement to the film".

See also
Nirvana bootleg recordings
Foo Fighters discography

References

External links
 Nirvana official page
 Nirvana Live Guide
 Live Nirvana
 
 

Discographies of American artists
Discography
Alternative rock discographies
Rock music group discographies